Yaguate is a municipality (municipio) of the San Cristóbal province in the Dominican Republic.

Geography
Yaguate is located about 30 miles from San Cristóbal near the DR-2 that goes to Baní.

The town square has a  basketball court and several churches.  There is also the Ayuntamiento, the town hall. There is a small secondary school, a clinic, and a few small grocery stores, along with several bars.  The region is filled with sugar cane fields, and nearby the town is a large sugar refinery called "Ingenio Caei."

The road heading north from the town leads through several small neighborhoods to the Nizao river.  There are many sand mines in the area, as well as some very good swimming spots as the river is very clear. Farther up the road is the Valdesia Dam.

In 2003, the town suffered a flood that covered roughly half of the town. Missionaries from the Church of Jesus Christ of Latter Day Saints helped to rescue many people from the flood, although one person died, trapped behind a locked door.

Well-known people
Michael Pineda,(b 1989) is a professional baseball pitcher for the Detroit Tigers 
Jeurys Familia,(b 1989) is a professional baseball pitcher for the Philadelphia Phillies
Jose Ramirez,(b 1990) is a professional baseball pitcher.
Arodys Vizcaíno, (b 1990) is a professional baseball pitcher in the Kansas City Royals organization.

References

In Spanish News of Yaguate San Cristobal  Dominican Republic

Populated places in San Cristóbal Province
Municipalities of the Dominican Republic